Nina Antonia (born Nina Antonia Benjamin in 1960) is an English author who has chronicled the lives and misadventures of Johnny Thunders, the New York Dolls, Peter Perrett, and the elusive Brett Smiley. Antonia's later work has explored decadent and supernatural themes, which led to a novel, The Greenwood Faun, as well as the editorship of "Incurable"- The Haunted Writings of Lionel Johnson, the Decadent Era’s Dark Angel.

Background
Antonia is featured in the Sundance nominated documentary New York Doll alongside Morrissey, Mick Jones and Iggy Pop and can be seen in Danny Garcia's poignant documentary Looking For Johnny. Nina also appears in Garcia's 2019 documentary, Stiv – No Compromise, No Regrets about Stiv Bators. As well as appearing on Radio One and Radio Six, Nina has performed at spoken word events and enjoyed a retrospective of her work at the Barbican curated by Jay Clifton. Clifton commented: "The special value of Nina's oeuvre lies not so much in her subjects but in her personal commitment to both the documentation of them and a search for the truth about both their character and their cultural significance. "Like the best writers, she begins with personal fascinations. But with a balance of personal feelings and objective contemplation, combined with a fluid literary style, she writes books that resonate beyond the parameters of the surface material." In 2013, Antonia lectured on Glam at Tate Liverpool.

Antonia was born in Liverpool. Her first book, Johnny Thunders... In Cold Blood (Jungle Records, 1987), which has been in print for over 25 years, was hailed by the New Musical Express as "gorgeously sordid". In 2012, the book was optioned by a Hollywood production company.  A deluxe Italian translation of the Thunders book appeared in late 2015 from Pipeline Books.

In March 2015, Antonia's The One and Only: Peter Perrett, Homme Fatale was re-published by Thin Man Press. The new, expanded edition was hailed as 'a ravishing read' and 'an engrossing account'. Reviewer Gus Ironside, writing in 'Louder than War' suggested that Nina Antonia merits a far higher media profile but has been 'excluded from the "Boys' Club" of mainstream rock journalism'. Antonia appeared in conversation with Perrett at the Albert Hall to coincide with the new edition.

Antonia's first supernatural novel, The Greenwood Faun, was published by Egaeus Press in December 2017 and was reviewed by Mark Andresen in Pan Review and Michael Dirda for The Washington Post.

In October 2018, Incurable: The Haunted Writings of Lionel Johnson, the Decadent Era’s Dark Angel, which has been edited by Nina Antonia and includes a detailed biographical essay by her, was released by Strange Attractor Press. Incurable has been included in articles by Michael Dirda for the Washington Post, Duncan Fallowell of The Spectator, and Eric Hoffman of the Fortean Times.

In September 2021, Nina Antonia was asked by BBC News Online to expand upon a tweet concerning the killing of a rare white deer on the streets of Bootle by Merseyside Police.

Selected works

Movies 
New York Doll (Documentary on Arthur Kane, 2005)
Looking for Johnny (Documentary on Johnny Thunders, 2014)
Stiv - No Compromise, No Regrets (Documentary on Stiv Bators, 2019)

References

External links 
 
 
 
 
 
"Review of Incurable: The Haunted Writings of Lionel Johnson, the Decadent Era's Dark Angel". The Gay & Lesbian Review. 

Living people
1960 births
English journalists
English women journalists
Journalists from Liverpool
20th-century English women writers
20th-century English writers
21st-century English women writers